The Fourth Protocol is a thriller novel by British writer Frederick Forsyth, published in August 1984.

Etymology
The title refers to the 1968 Nuclear Non-Proliferation Treaty, which (at least in the world of the novel) contained four secret protocols. The fourth of these was meant to prohibit non-conventional deliveries of nuclear weapons, i.e. by means other than being dropped from aircraft or carried on ballistic missiles. This included postal delivery or being assembled in secret, close to the target, before being detonated.

Plot

On New Year's Eve 1986, professional thief James Rawlings breaks into the apartment of a senior civil servant and inadvertently discovers stolen top secret documents. While a notorious and infamous criminal, he is patriotic enough to  anonymously send the documents to MI5 so that they might locate the traitor.

In Moscow, British defector Kim Philby drafts a memorandum for the Soviet General Secretary stating that, should the Labour Party win the next general election in the United Kingdom (scheduled for sometime in the subsequent eighteen months), the "hard left" of the party will oust the moderate populist Neil Kinnock in favour of a radical new leader who will adopt a true Marxist-Leninist manifesto, including the expulsion of all American forces from the United Kingdom and the country's withdrawal from (and repudiation of) NATO. In conjunction with a GRU general, an academic named Krilov, and a Chess grandmaster and experienced strategist, they devise "Plan Aurora" to secure a Labour victory by exploiting the party's support for unilateral disarmament.

John Preston, an ex-Parachute Regiment soldier-turned-MI5 officer, who was exploring hard-left infiltration of the Labour Party, is assigned to investigate the stolen documents and discovers they were leaked by George Berenson, a passionate anti-communist and staunch supporter of apartheid South Africa. Berenson passed on the documents to Jan Marais, who he believes is a South African diplomat, but is in fact a Soviet false flag operative. SIS chief Sir Nigel Irvine eventually confronts Berenson with the truth and "turns" him, using him to pass disinformation to the KGB.

As part of Plan Aurora, Soviet agent Valeri Petrofsky arrives under deep cover in the United Kingdom and establishes a base using a house in Ipswich. From there, he travels around the country collecting packages from various couriers who have smuggled them into the country either hidden or disguised as seemingly harmless artefacts.

One of the couriers, masquerading as a sailor, is assaulted by Neds in Glasgow and hospitalised, where he commits suicide rather than submit to interrogation. Preston investigates and finds three out-of-place looking metal discs in a tobacco tin in his gunny sack. He shows the discs to a metallurgist who identifies the outer two as aluminium but the third as polonium, a key element in the initiator of an atomic bomb. Preston reports his findings to his antagonistic MI5 superior, the acting Director-General Brian Harcourt-Smith, who ignores them, has Preston taken off the politically embarrassing case and requests the human resource department to arrange that Preston take leave. Irvine, however, suspects that a major intelligence operation is underway, and has Preston work unofficially for him to search for other Soviet couriers (his absence from the office being justified by the coincidental order to take leave). Simultaneously, he uses Berenson to pass a deliberate piece of disinformation to the KGB.

In Moscow, the director of foreign operations for the KGB, General Karpov, discovers Aurora's existence. He determines that the general secretary is responsible, and blackmails Krilov into revealing the plan: in contravention of the Fourth Protocol, the component parts of a small atomic device are to be smuggled into the United Kingdom, to be assembled and exploded near RAF Bentwaters a week before the general election. Irrefutable evidence will be left that the explosion was an accidental detonation of an American tactical nuclear weapon, leading to a general wave of anti-Americanism, support for unilateral nuclear disarmament and for the only major party committed to disarmament, the Labour Party. The day after they win the election, the hard left will take over and begin to dismantle the Western alliance in Europe.

Preston attempts, albeit fruitlessly, to uncover other couriers connected to the operation. A month into the investigation, a bumbling Czechoslovakian operative, originally believed to be an Austrian, under the name 'Franz Winkler' arrives at Heathrow with a forged visa in his passport and is shadowed to a house in Chesterfield. Preston's patience is rewarded when Petrofsky shows up to use the radio transmitter that is located there. He trails Petrofsky to his rented house, where the bomb has been assembled. An SAS team is called in to storm the house, and wounds Petrofsky before he can detonate the bomb. Despite Preston's express wishes, the commanding officer kills the Spetsnaz agent during the raid. Before dying Petrofsky manages to say one last word: "Philby".

Preston confronts Irvine with his theory that Philby deliberately blew the operation; the latter did not know Petrofsky's location but instead sent Franz Winkler, with an obviously fake identity document, to the transmitter's location and ultimately, to Petrofsky. Irvine admits to sabotaging the KGB's British operation by leaking disinformation through Berenson to General Karpov that they were closing in on their suspect. In turn, Karpov (and not Philby) sent Winkler, sabotaging Plan Aurora. By sending Winkler, Karpov has thwarted a British publicity victory as Irvine understood the implication that Petrofsky must not be caught alive or exposed in the media. Preston, however, is disappointed that Petrofsky was killed outright rather than arrested. Irvine also admits that Philby has indeed been passing intelligence to the British embassy in Moscow (via carrier pigeons), hoping to earn repatriation back to the United Kingdom, but he did not expose Plan Aurora, and even if he had, as far as Irvine is concerned, "he can rot in hell."

At the novel's end, Harcourt-Smith is turned down for the position of Director-General of MI5, owing to his poor judgment in the case, and subsequently resigns from MI5 altogether. Preston also resigns but, through Irvine, finds lucrative private-sector employment that enables him to obtain full custody of his son. Marais is taken into custody by South African intelligence and Berenson's efforts are rendered unusable to the KGB, as Irvine intends to use his own spy network and plant the suspicion that Berenson was, in fact, a double agent, so that his information will be considered suspect.

Adaptations
In 1985 The Fourth Protocol  was adapted into a computer game for the ZX Spectrum and Commodore 64 home computers.
In 1987 the book was made into a film starring Michael Caine and Pierce Brosnan.

1984 British novels
Fiction set in 1986
Fiction set in 1987
British thriller novels
Novels by Frederick Forsyth
Novels set in Suffolk
MI5 in fiction
Secret Intelligence Service in fiction
Hutchinson (publisher) books
Novels about nuclear war and weapons
Novels set during the Cold War
Novels set in the Soviet Union
British novels adapted into films
Novels set in South Africa
Novels set in Scotland
Cultural depictions of the Cambridge Five
Novels set in Switzerland
Novels set in Belgium